Indian New Life League is a denomination of the Christian church, with one congregation in Bhutan.

References 

Christianity in Bhutan